U Aung Kham Hti is a Burmese politician and former monk. He was the Chairman of the Pa-O National Organisation (PNO), which he re-organised in 1976. Its military wing, known as the Pa-O National Army was also headed by him. On 11 April 1991, the PNO, under his leadership, agreed a ceasefire with the ruling State Law and Order Restoration Council. The PNO was granted a number of business concessions and control over some territory in the southwest Shan State, which later became known as the Shan State (South) Special Region-6. Presently, he is a co-chairman of the Union Solidarity and Development Association, Shan State (South) branch. In April 2022, after the 2021 Myanmar coup d'état, Aung Kham Hti was awarded the title of Wunna Kyawhtin.

See also
 Pa-O people
 Internal conflict in Myanmar

References

Living people
Year of birth missing (living people)
Pa-O National Organisation politicians
People from Shan State
Burmese monks